Racing Romance may refer to:
 Racing Romance (1926 film), an American silent action film
 Racing Romance (1937 film), a British comedy film